Kulina is a village in the municipality of Osmaci, Bosnia and Herzegovina.

References

Populated places in Osmaci
Villages in Republika Srpska